Lampang is one of Thailand's seventy-six provinces (changwat), lies in upper northern Thailand. The old name of Lampang was Khelang Nakhon.

Geography
Lampang is in the broad river valley of the Wang River, surrounded by mountains. In Mae Mo district lignite is found and mined in open pits.

Within the province are Chae Son and Doi Khun Tan National Parks in the Khun Tan Range, as well as Tham Pha Thai, Doi Luang National Park, and the Huai Tak Teak Biosphere Reserve in the Phi Pan Nam Range.

National parks
There are  a total of eight national parks, six ofwhich are in region 13 (Lampang branch), Doi Luang in region 15 (Chiang Mai), and Wiang Kosai in region 13 (Phrae) of Thailand's protected areas.
 Tham Pha Tai National Park, 
 Doi Luang National Park, 
 Mae Wa National Park, 
 Wiang Kosai national Park, 
 Doi Chong National Park, 
 Chae Son National Park,
 Doi Khun Tan National Park,
 Khelang Banphot National Park,

Wildlife sanctuaries
There are two wildlife sanctuaries, Doi Pha Muang in region 13 (Lampang branch) and Tham Chao Ram in region 14 (Tak) of Thailand's protected areas.
 Doi Pha Muang Wildlife Sanctuary, 
 Tham Chao Ram Wildlife Sanctuary,

History
Starting in the 7th century Lampang was part of the Dvaravati period Hariphunchai Kingdom of the Mon. In the 11th century the Khmer Empire occupied the Lampang area, but it was King Mengrai of Lanna who incorporated the complete Haripunchai Kingdom into his kingdom in 1292. Lampang or Nakhon Lampang or Lakhon, was under Burmese rule after the fall of Lanna Kingdom from the 16th century to 18th century. During the uprising against Burmese rule by Siam's new kings in the late-18th century, a local Lampang leader became Siam's ally. After the victory, the leader, Kawila, was named the ruler of Chiang Mai, the former center of Lanna, while his relative ruled Lampang. The city continues to be one of the important economic and political centers in the north. Lampang became a province of Thailand in 1892.

Transport
The city is an important highway hub, with a four lane highway link to Chiang Mai and Chiang Rai, as well as a major highway to Phrae and the eastern Lanna provinces. Lampang is roughly a 1.5 hour bus ride to Chiang Mai. Lampang is a stop for the Chiang Mai-bound train, approximately 10 hours from Bangkok.

Lampang Airport is served by Bangkok Airways (three flights daily to Suvarnabhumi Airport) and Nok air (four flights daily to Don Mueang) (Oct 2015).

Health 
The main hospital of Lampang is Lampang Hospital, operated by the Ministry of Public Health.

Tourism
Lampang province is not visited by many tourists, only about 900,000 per year, most of them passing through. In early 2019, the provincial governor rolled out a program called "Lampang: Dream Destination" to raise the number of visitors to two million within two years.

Economy

Lampang is known for the production of ceramic goods and its mining operations. A great deal of ball clay, china stone, and lignite are extracted from the surrounding mountains.
There are more than 200 ceramic factories in and around Mueang Lampang District. Most are small- to medium-sized operations producing novelties (plant pots, dolls), tableware, and building materials (tiles, railings).
The largest coal fired power plant in Southeast Asia is in Mae Mo District near the lignite mining area. The plant uses lignite as fuel. The largest concrete plant is also north of Mueang Lampang. This is also powered by lignite. Limestone is another abundant rock mined in Lampang. 
Agriculturally, the province produces rice and pineapples.

Symbols 
The provincial seal shows a white rooster inside the entrance to the Phra That Lampang Luang Temple. According to local legend, Buddha visited the province. The god Indra worried that the people would not wake up by themselves to show respect to Buddha, and therefore woke them by transforming himself into a white rooster.

The provincial flower is the Heliconia (Heliconia sp.), and the provincial tree is the Indian Elm (Holoptelea integrifolia). According to the legend, this tree was planted in the temple during Buddha's visit.

Administrative divisions

Provincial government
The province is divided into 13 districts (amphoes). These are further divided into 100 subdistricts (tambons) and 855 villages (mubans).

Local government
As of 26 November 2019 there are: one Lampang Provincial Administration Organisation and 42 municipal (thesaban) areas in the province. Lampang has city (thesaban nakhon) status. Khelang Nakhon, Lom Raet and Phichai have town (thesaban mueang) status. Further 38 subdistrict municipalities (thesaban tambon). The non-municipal areas are administered by 60 Subdistrict Administrative Organisations - SAO (ongkan borihan suan tambon).

Human achievement index 2017

Since 2003, United Nations Development Programme (UNDP) in Thailand has tracked progress on human development at sub-national level using the Human achievement index (HAI), a composite index covering all the eight key areas of human development. National Economic and Social Development Board (NESDB) has taken over this task since 2017.

Gallery

References

External links

Province page from the Tourist Authority of Thailand
Golden Jubilee Network province guide
 Lampang provincial map, coat of arms and postal stamp

 
Provinces of Thailand
1892 establishments in Siam